Jagged Alliance 3 is an upcoming tactical role-playing video game developed by Haemimont Games and published by THQ Nordic. The game is set to be released for Windows. It is the first mainline entry in the Jagged Alliance series since Jagged Alliance 2 (1999).

Gameplay
Played from an isometric perspective, Jagged Alliance 3 is a turn-based strategy video game in which the player issues command to a squad of mercenaries. Each member of the player's squad has their own unique backstories and personalities. The game features a roster of 40 mercenaries, including several returning characters including Vicki Waters, Ivan Dolvich, and Fidel Dahan. Weapons can be customized, and the mercenaries can aim at individual body parts of an enemy. They can also be looted for their resources. Players can also access a dynamic campaign map, which will provide them with more context about each individual turn-based battle, and how the enemy forces react to them as they attempt to retake these territories. Players will also gain intel as they progress, thus unlocking additional side missions and opportunities. As the mercenaries level up, they will also unlock new skills and abilities. The game will also feature a cooperative multiplayer mode.

Plot
The fictional country of Grand Chien has been in chaos following the kidnapping of its president by a rogue paramilitary force known as "the Legion". With their remaining resources, the president's family hires a group of elite mercenaries from the Adonis Corporation, who will attempt to rescue the president and bring order to the country.

Development
Jagged Alliance 3 was first announced in 2004. Strategy First and Game Factory Interactive initially partnered with Russian studio MiST Land South to produce a sequel to the game. However, a year later, Strategy First withdrew the title from MiST Land South and began developing the title internally. In December 2006, Strategy First outsourced Jagged Alliance 3 again. The publisher, along with Russian developers Akella and F3games, were to create the game, setting an approximate release date of late 2008. As of October 2008 the game has been delayed again, and Akella's website was displaying a release date of Q1 2010, but the studio also stopped developing the game in 2009.

On March 9, 2010, German outfit bitComposer Games (now bitComposer Entertainment AG) picked up the rights to the PC strategy series, and started "preliminary development" on the third full game for release in 2011. In August 2015, Nordic Games acquired the rights from bitComposer. On September 17, 2021, during the THQ Nordic 10th Anniversary Digital Showcase Jagged Alliance 3 was announced for PC, now in development by Haemimont Games, the developer of the Tropico series. Haemimont Games initially pitched a spin-off project to THQ Nordic, but the publisher was very impressed by the studio's work and instead recruited them to create a mainline sequel instead. THQ Nordic recognized that previous attempts at reviving the series had received a very mixed reception, and Jagged Alliance 3 was designed to cater to the "hardcore" fans of the series. Unlike other strategy games such as the XCOM series, Jagged Alliance 3 will not inform players regarding the chance to hit an opponent or their responses to attack. The team believed the franchise should be about responding to unpredictable and chaotic combat situations, and an over-abundance of information may cause players to be too cautious and calculating.

References

External links
 

Upcoming video games
Jagged Alliance
Turn-based strategy video games
Video games set in a fictional country
Windows games
THQ Nordic games
Video games developed in Bulgaria
Multiplayer and single-player video games
Turn-based tactics video games
Video game sequels